Howard Long (1905–1939) was an American convicted murderer.

Howard Long may also refer to:

 Howie Long (born 1960), American former National Football League (NFL) defensive end
 Howard Rusk Long (1906–1988), American journalist and author
 Howard Hale Long (1888–1948), American educational psychologist

See also
 Christopher Howard Long (born 1985), former American football defensive end
 Kyle Howard Long (born 1988), former American football guard
 Howard Longley House, historic house in South Pasadena, California